The Cheetah Girls may refer to:

The Cheetah Girls (franchise), a series of young adult novels by Deborah Gregory and the spin-offs made from the novels, including a film series
The Cheetah Girls (film), a 2003 Disney Channel Original Movie based on the books
 The Cheetah Girls (soundtrack)
The Cheetah Girls 2, 2006 sequel 
 The Cheetah Girls 2 (soundtrack)
The Cheetah Girls: One World, 2008 sequel
 The Cheetah Girls: One World (soundtrack)
The Cheetah Girls (video game), the video game inspired by the first two films
The Cheetah Girls: Pop Star Sensations, the Nintendo DS game inspired by the first two films
The Cheetah Girls: Passport to Stardom, the Nintendo DS game inspired by the first three films
The Cheetah Girls (group), a musical group made famous by the films of the books